Boysidia megaphonum is a species of terrestrial pulmonate gastropod in the family Vertiginidae, the whorl snails.

The distribution of Boysidia megaphonum is restricted to a narrow region (0.25 km2) of karstic moist-forest near Bukit Charas, Pahang, in Peninsular Malaysia''.

References

Vertiginidae
Invertebrates of Malaysia
Gastropods described in 1950
Taxobox binomials not recognized by IUCN